Chris Peterson (born May 14, 1968) is a Canadian producer and electronic musician from Vancouver. Throughout his career, he has worked with numerous bands in the Canadian industrial and electronic music scene of which Front Line Assembly and Delerium are the most notable. He is married to Kerry Peterson of Stiff Valentine.

Music career

Current bands and projects 
 Decree
 Öhm
 Stiff Valentine
 Unit 187

Former bands and projects 
 Delerium
 Equinox
 Front Line Assembly (on the [FLA]vour of the Weak, Implode and Epitaph albums)
 Noise Unit
 Pro>Tech
 Revelstoker
 Will

References 

1968 births
Living people
Canadian electronic musicians
Canadian industrial musicians
Canadian keyboardists
Musicians from London, Ontario
Musicians from Vancouver
Front Line Assembly members
Delerium members
Will (band) members
Noise Unit members